Vizefeldwebel Josef Schwendemann was a World War I flying ace credited with 17 aerial victories.

Biography
See also Aerial victory standards of World War I

Josef Schwendemann is believed to have been born in 1888.

Initially serving in the trenches early in World War I, and twice being wounded, Schwendemann transferred to Die Fliegertruppe (The Flying Troupe) in June 1916. He served with Schutzstaffel 14 from February 1917 before being sent to fighter school to become a pilot. He was posted to Jagdstaffel 41 in September. On the 19th, he shot down his first enemy. He would run off a string of 11 more victories by 25 July, the majority being opposing enemy fighters. He was then supplied with a new Fokker D.VII; he scored five more victories with it, though details have been lost. On 30 September 1918, he was honored Prussia's highest decoration for valor, the Golden Military Merit Cross.

Sources of information

References

 Above the Lines: The Aces and Fighter Units of the German Air Service, Naval Air Service and Flanders Marine Corps, 1914–1918. Norman Franks, Frank W. Bailey, Russell Guest. Grub Street, 1993. , .

Fokker D VII Aces of World War 1, Part 2. Norman Franks, Greg VanWyngarden. Osprey Publishing, 2004. , 

1918 deaths
1888 births
German World War I flying aces
Luftstreitkräfte personnel
German military personnel killed in World War I